Coccygodes is a genus of wasps in the subfamily Cryptinae, tribe Cryptini and subtribe Baryceratina.

Species 
 Coccygodes alacer Tosquinet, 1896
 Coccygodes bifasciatus Cameron, 1912
 Coccygodes bimaculator (Thunberg, 1822)
 Coccygodes brevispiculus Waterston, 1927
 Coccygodes corpulentus Tosquinet, 1896
 Coccygodes eugeneus Tosquinet, 1896
 Coccygodes nobilis (Saussure, 1892)
 Coccygodes pictipennis Tosquinet, 1896
 Coccygodes rufopetiolatus Waterston, 1927
 Coccygodes subquadratus Waterston, 1927
 Coccygodes superbus Szépligeti, 1916
 Coccygodes townesorum De Santis, 1967

 Names brought to synonymy
 Coccygodes erythrostomus, synonym of Coccygodes pictipennis
 Coccygodes nigrescens, synonym of Coccygodes bifasciatus
 Coccygodes notatus, synonym of Coccygodes superbus
 Coccygodes ruficeps, synonym of Coccygodes townesorum
 Coccygodes waterstoni, synonym of Coccygodes brevispiculus

References

External links 

 Coccygodes at insectoid.info

Cryptinae
Ichneumonidae genera